Dilara Hashem (21 August 1935 – 19 March 2022) was a Bangladeshi author and novelist. She was a recipient of the Bangla Academy Literary Award (1976). 

Hashem died in Maryland on 19 March 2022 at the age of 86.

Works

Novels
Ghar Mon Janala  (Houses, Hearts and Windows, 1965)
Ekoda Ebong Ananto (Once and Ever, 1975)
Stabdhatar Kane Kane (Whispering to Silence, 1977)
Amlokir Mou (The Sweet from the Bitterest, 1978)
Badami  Bikeler  Galpo (Stories of a Brown Afternoon,  1983);
Kaktaleya (Coincident,  1985)
Mural  (1986)
Shankho Korat (Horns of a Dilemma 1995)
Anukta Padaboli (Unspoken Verses, 1998)
Sador  Andor (Outer and Inner Part, 1998)
Setu (Bridge, 2000)

Awards
Bangla Academy Literary Award (1976)
Shankhachil Sahitya Puraskar
Uttar Chicago Shitya  Puraskar  (1997)

References

External links
Official Website - 

1936 births
2022 deaths
Bangladeshi writers
Bengali-language writers
Bengali novelists
Bangladeshi women novelists
Recipients of Bangla Academy Award
20th-century novelists
20th-century Bangladeshi women writers
21st-century novelists
21st-century Bangladeshi women writers
20th-century Bangladeshi writers
21st-century Bangladeshi writers
People from Jessore District